Bocasan was an oral wound cleanser manufactured in the United Kingdom by Knox Laboratories Ltd of London from 1960–1975, before being rebranded as an Oral-B product

Production of Bocasan appears to have ceased by 2003. A similar product, Amosan was available for a period before also ceasing production in 2010. As of 2013, a Dutch pharmacy offers the same formulation under the name Bikosan

It was used to aid treatment, in adults or children over 5 years old, of periodontal conditions such as canker sores, denture irritation, orthodontic irritation, or after dental procedures.

Bocasan was packaged in a 1.7 gram envelope, and contained 69.72% sodium perborate monohydrate and 29.68% sodium hydrogen tartrate anhydrous. To use, the contents were dissolved in 30 cubic centimetres of warm water. Half the amount was swilled around the mouth for two minutes and discarded, and the procedure repeated with the remainder. Treatment was recommended three times a day after meals.

A 1979 double-blind crossover study suggests that hydrogen peroxide, which is released during the use of this product, may prevent or retard colonization and multiplication of anaerobic bacteria, such as those that inhabit oral wounds. A small (n=12) 1998 RCT shows that Bocasan combined with chlorhexidine mouthwash is better than chlorhexidine alone in preventing plaque. A further study (n=28) shows that Bocasan reduces the staining associated with chlorhexidine.

Drug facts
Active ingredient: Sodium perborate monohydrate 
Inactive ingredients: Sodium hydrogen tartrate
Purpose: Oral cleanser
Normal use: Use up to three times daily, after meals or as directed by a dentist

References 

Dental equipment